This is a list of notable people who follow the straight edge lifestyle. Straight edge is a subculture and subgenre of hardcore punk whose adherents refrain from using alcohol, tobacco, and other recreational/non-prescribed drugs. It was a direct reaction to the sexual revolution, hedonism, and excess associated with punk rock. For some, this extends to not engaging in promiscuous sex, following a vegetarian or vegan diet, and not using caffeine or prescription drugs.

List of straight edge people

List of former straight edge people

See also
List of notable teetotalers
List of straight edge bands
List of vegetarians
List of vegans

References

Hardcore punk
Punk rock
people who follow a straight edge lifestyle